Noel Andrew Burke (born 29 November 1962 in Belfast) is an Irish singer, who is best known for replacing Ian McCulloch as the lead singer with Echo & the Bunnymen.

Burke's first band was St. Vitus Dance, which released the album Love Me, Love My Dogma in 1987 before splitting up a few years later. Shortly after the split, Burke was contacted by Will Sergeant and eventually joined the Bunnymen as lead vocalist. The band released Reverberation (1990) to mostly negative reviews, though the album has subsequently garnered some acclaim. The Bunnymen formally announced their disbandment in 1993, but Ian, Will and Les Pattinson reformed the band four years later and are still active today, minus Les.

In 2005, Burke reformed St. Vitus Dance for some live shows, and an album of new material, Glyphotheque, was released in 2008.

Album discography

With St. Vitus Dance
Love Me Love My Dogma (1987)
Glyphotheque (2008)
Bystanders (2012)

With Echo & the Bunnymen
Reverberation (1990)

References

Male singers from Northern Ireland
Musicians from Belfast
Echo & the Bunnymen members
1962 births
Living people